Druzhby Narodiv or Friendship of Peoples (named after the road above the station) is a station of Kyiv Metro's Syretsko-Pecherska Line. It is situated between Pecherska and Vydubychi stations. This station was opened on 30 December 1991.

Druzhby Narodiv station was designed by architects Alyoshkin and Krushynskiy. It is a deep level station. The station is connected by escalators with a passenger tunnel situated under Druzhby Narodiv boulevard.

Druzhby Narodiv station operates from 05:43 to 00:12.

On Friday 13 January 2023 the Kyiv City Council announced the metro station would be renamed. In a poll organised by them Kyiv residents cast more than 100,000 votes for the renaming of seven city objects, including this and the metro station Ploshcha Lva Tolstoho. In a May 2022 online poll (with 170,000 respondents) voters chose to rename the station Botanical - after the nearby Hryshko National Botanical Garden - in a poll taken during the 2022 Russian invasion of Ukraine; other choices included European and Red Vibernum. The Druzhba Narodiv boulevard itself was renamed to Mykola Mikhnovsky boulevard on 8 December 2022. In the January 2023 poll the majority of votes went to the name  (Ukrainian: Звіринець), a historical neighbourhood inside Pecherskyi District where the metro station is situated in.

References

External links 

  Kyivsky Metropoliten - Station description and Photographs
  Metropoliten.kiev.ua - Station description and Photographs
 Photo of the Station from WikiMaps

Kyiv Metro stations
Railway stations opened in 1991
1991 establishments in Ukraine